Knut Gustafsson is a retired Swedish bandy player. Gustafsson was part of the Djurgården Swedish champions' team of 1912.

References

Swedish bandy players
Djurgårdens IF Bandy players